Annear is a surname. Notable people with the surname include:

John Annear (born 1961), Australian rules footballer
John Annear (politician) (1842–1910), Australian politician
Paul Annear (1947–2016), New Zealand jeweller

See also
Harold Desbrowe-Annear (1865–1933), Australian architect